Quinn Emanuel Urquhart & Sullivan, LLP is a global white shoe law firm headquartered in Los Angeles, California. The firm employs approximately 800 attorneys throughout 23 offices around the world.

History
The firm was established in 1986 by John B. Quinn, Eric Emanuel, David Quinto, and Phyllis Kupferstein, with the purpose of being a litigation-only firm. Name partner A. William Urquhart joined in 1988.

Part of the firm's self-image is its lack of a formal dress code. This casual self-image extends into the corporate structure of the firm, which eschews any formal management committees, other than an advisory committee for the evaluation of contingency fee cases. About 35 percent of Quinn attorneys went to Yale, Harvard, Stanford, Chicago, New York University, or Columbia law schools.

Quinn Emanuel is the first AmLaw 100 firm to have a female name partner. The firm changed its name in March 2010 to include Kathleen Sullivan, former Dean of Stanford Law School, who heads the firm's appellate practice. The firm was previously known as Quinn Emanuel Urquhart Oliver & Hedges.

In 2014, the firm was the subject of a Freedom of Information Act request by Microsoft, in connection with a contract it had supposedly signed with the IRS.

Intellectual property litigation is the firm’s largest practice area and currently has over 200 lawyers who litigate IP cases. Quinn Emanuel represented the Winklevoss twins' social network, ConnectU, in its lawsuit that accused Facebook founder Mark Zuckerberg of stealing ideas for his own social network.  The parties reached a confidential settlement, yet Quinn Emanuel later revealed the confidential settlement amount of $65 million in a firm advertisement.

International expansion and offices
Beginning in 2007, Quinn Emanuel expanded internationally by opening its first foreign office in Tokyo. A year later, the firm expanded to London, then Chicago in 2009, Mannheim, Germany in 2010, Moscow in 2011, and Hamburg in 2012. On September 1, 2011, Washington, D.C.'s Legal Times Blog announced that the firm was opening its first office in the nation's capital. In 2013, the firm opened offices in Paris, Munich, Hong Kong, and Sydney, and, in 2014, it opened offices in Brussels and Houston office. LegalWeek reported that Quinn Emanuel opened an office in Seattle in 2015. Other offices of the firm are located in New York City, San Francisco, Silicon Valley, Stuttgart, Perth, Shanghai and Zurich.

Recognition and rankings
Quinn Emanuel consistently ranks among the top of various industry surveys. The American Lawyer ranked the firm "Top IP Litigation Department of the Year" in 2010 and one of the top six Litigation Departments in the U.S. In 2012, The American Lawyer recognized the firm as having one of the top three IP Litigation Departments in the country In 2016, The American Lawyer ranked the firm one of the top six Litigation Departments in the U.S. Chambers and Partners recognized John B. Quinn as "one of the best trial lawyers in California." Chambers and Partners also ranked Quinn Emanuel among the top tiers for the following categories: Intellectual Property:  Patent, Trademark, Copyright & Trade Secrets; Litigation: General Commercial, Trial Lawyers and White-Collar Crime & Government Investigations; Media and Entertainment; Appellate Law; Bankruptcy and Reconstructing; Sports Law; and Insurance.

Quinn Emanuel regularly appears within the top three of The American Lawyer'''s annual listing of highest profits per partner. In 2010, Quinn Emanuel posted profits per partner of $3.6 million, ranking number two in the United States. In 2011, profits per partner rose to $4.1 million. In the subsequent four years, Quinn Emanuel has been second in profits per partner, with 2014 rising to $4.925 million. The American Lawyer also ranked the firm first in profit margin in 2014.

In Vault.com's specialty rankings of 2013, Quinn Emanuel ranked 1st in general commercial litigation and 5th in intellectual property litigation. In January 2011, Law360 awarded Quinn Emanuel the "Insurance Group of the Year" award. In June 2011, the British legal publication, The Lawyer awarded Quinn Emanuel's London office "International Law Firm of the Year." In 2011 for the second year in a row, The Financial Times named Quinn Emanuel a "Top Innovative Firm of the Year."   In October 2013, Quinn Emanuel was named one of the Most Feared Plaintiffs Firms by Law360. In 2012 and 2014, Legal Business named the firm "US Law Firm of the Year." In January 2014, Law360 awarded Quinn Emanuel "Practice Group of the Year" in the following categories: Appellate, IP, Banking, Class Action, and Insurance.

In 2015, Law360 awarded Quinn Emanuel "Practice Group of the Year" in the following categories:  Appellate, Banking, Class Action, Product Liability and White Collar. The following year, Law360'' once again awarded Quinn Emanuel "Practice Group of the Year" in the following categories: Banking, Intellectual Property, and White Collar. Since 2010, Quinn Emanuel has been recognized on BTI Consulting Group's "Fearsome Foursome" list of law firms most feared by in-house company lawyers.  The firm ranked first among the most feared for 2020.

Quinn Emanuel Urquhart & Sullivan, LLP has reportedly been quite selective in their recruiting process.  Since 2011, profits per equity partner have been the second highest in the world.

Notable partners 
John B. Quinn
Kathleen Sullivan
Christopher Landau
Andrew Schapiro
Alex Spiro

Notable alumni 
Jenny Durkan
Susan Estrich
Crystal Nix-Hines

See also
List of largest law firms by profits per partner

References

External links
Quinn Emanuel Urquhart and Sullivan LLP website

Law firms established in 1986
Law firms based in Los Angeles
Foreign law firms with offices in Japan
1986 establishments in California